The Six Days of Newark was a former six-day cycling event, held in Newark, New Jersey. From 1910 to 1915 four editions of the Six Days were held.

Roll of honor

Full results

1910
The 1910 Six Days of Newark took place from 6 to 12 February.
1. Willy Fenn senior (Usa) - Frank Kramer (Usa)
2. Ivar Lawson (Usa) - Jim Moran (Usa)
3. Paddy Hehir (Aus) - Ernie Pye (Aus)
4. John Bedell (Usa) - Menus Bedell (Usa)
5. Walter Bardgett (Usa) - Elmer Collins (Usa) à 1 tour
6. Niels-Marius Andersen (Dan) - Floyd Krebs (Usa)
7. Frank Galvin (Usa) - West (Usa)
8. Worth Mitten (Usa) - Rupprecht (Usa)

1913
1. Peter Drobach (Usa) - Paddy Hehir (Aus)
2. Worth Mitten (Usa) - Gordon Walker (Aus)
3. Martin Ryan (Usa) - Lloyd Thomas (Usa)
4. George Cameron (Usa) - Ray Dieffenbacher (Usa) à 1 tour
5. Clarence Carman (Usa) - Walter De Mara (Usa)
6. Willy Coburn (Usa) - Bill Loftes (Usa)
7. McKay (Usa) - Wilcox (Usa) à 2 tours
8. Jack Blatz (Usa) - Floyd Krebs (Usa) à 3 tours

1914
1. Alfred Gouller (Aus) - Alfred Hill (Usa)
2. George Cameron (Usa) - Harry Kaiser (Usa)
3. Gordon Walker (Aus) - Ted Wohlrab (Usa)
4. Frank Cavanagh (Usa) - Robert "Bob" Walthour senior (Usa)
5. Peter Drobach (Usa) - Jim Moran (Usa)
6. Frank Corry (Aus) - Robert "Bob" Spears (Aus)
7. Marcel Dupuy (Fra) - Victor Linart (Bel)

References

Cycle races in the United States
International cycle races hosted by the United States
Six-day races
Defunct cycling races in the United States
Sports in Newark, New Jersey